Olaria is a municipality in the state of Minas Gerais in the Southeast region of Brazil.  As of 2020, the estimated population was 1,720.

See also
List of municipalities in Minas Gerais

References

External links

Municipalities in Minas Gerais